Yampupata is a Bolivian peninsula of Lake Titicaca situated in the north-western part of the Copacabana Peninsula  in the La Paz Department, Manco Kapac Province, Copacabana Municipality, Zampaya Canton. It is located near the islands Isla de la Luna and Isla del Sol forming the Strait of Yampupata together with the latter one.

External links 
 Map of Manco Kapac Province

Peninsulas of Bolivia
Landforms of La Paz Department (Bolivia)
Lake Titicaca